Lucenay-l'Évêque is a commune in the Saône-et-Loire department in the region of Bourgogne-Franche-Comté in eastern France.

Geography 
The commune is in the far northwestern corner of the department, northwest of Autun.

The village lies in the Morvan massif, on the shores of the Ternin, a tributary to the Arroux.

See also
Communes of the Saône-et-Loire department
Parc naturel régional du Morvan

References

Communes of Saône-et-Loire